The Men's triple jump event  at the 2011 European Athletics Indoor Championships was held on March 4–6, 2011 with the final being held on March 6 at 16:25 local time.

Records

Results

Qualification
Qualification: Qualification Performance 16.95 (Q) or at least 8 best performers advanced to the final. It was held at 17:20.

Final
The final was held at 16:25.

References

Triple jump at the European Athletics Indoor Championships
2011 European Athletics Indoor Championships